Club Deportivo Colunga is a Spanish football club based in Colunga, in the autonomous community of Asturias.

History
Founded in 1934, CD Colunga played its entire history in the Regional divisions until it was promoted for the first time to the Tercera División in May 2015.

Season to season

6 seasons in Tercera División
1 season in Tercera División RFEF

Notable players
 Dani Borreguero

References

External links
Official website

Football clubs in Asturias
Association football clubs established in 1934
1934 establishments in Spain